Zocchi is an Italian surname. Notable people with the surname include:

 Arnoldo Zocchi (also Arnaldo) (1862–1940), Italian sculptor
 Emilio Zocchi (1835–1913), Italian sculptor
 Giuseppe Zocchi (c. 1711–1767), Italian painter and printmaker
 Louis Zocchi (born 1935), gaming hobbyist, former game distributor and publisher
 Nietta Zocchi (1909–1981), Italian film actress

Italian-language surnames